The 2010–11 Cincinnati Bearcats men's basketball team represented the University of Cincinnati during the 2010–11 NCAA Division I men's basketball season. The team plays its home games in Cincinnati at the Fifth Third Arena, which has a capacity of 13,176. They are members of the Big East Conference. They were invited to the NCAA Tournament who they defeated Missouri in the first round before falling to the NCAA Champions UConn in the second round.

Offseason

Departing players

Recruiting class of 2010

Recruiting class of 2011

Roster

Depth chart

Source

Schedule

|-
!colspan=12 style=|Exhibition

|-
!colspan=12 style=|Regular Season

|-
!colspan=12 style=|Big East tournament 

|-
!colspan=12 style=|NCAA Tournament 

Source

Awards and milestones

Big East Conference honors

All-Big East Rookie Team
Sean Kilpatrick

Rookie of the Week
Week 1: Sean Kilpatrick
Week 13: Sean Kilpatrick

Source

Rankings

1 – Note that rankings above 25 are not official rankings. They are representations of ranking based on the number of points received in the weekly poll.

References

Cincinnati Bearcats
Cincinnati Bearcats men's basketball seasons
Cincinnati Bearcats
Cincin
Cincin